Banisteriopsis elegans is a species of flowering plants in the family Malpighiaceae. It is found in Colombia and Mexico.

References

External links 
 Banisteriopsis elegans at The Plant List
 Banisteriopsis elegans at Tropicos

Malpighiaceae
Plants described in 1943
Flora of Colombia
Flora of Mexico